William Thomas Moncrieff (24 August 1794 – 3 December 1857) commonly referred as W.T. Moncrieff was an English dramatist and author.

Biography
He was born in London, the son of a Strand tradesman named Thomas. The name Moncrieff he assumed for theatrical purposes. Moncrieff's first success was at Astley's circus with The Dandy Family an equestrian drama, and in 1820 The Lear of Private Life, with Junius Brutus Booth as hero, enjoyed a long run. He supplied Drury Lane with a romantic melodrama called The Cataract of the Ganges; or, The Rajah’s Daughter which gave the national theatre an opportunity of displaying upon its stage both real horses and a real waterfall. This work became very popular with performances at provincial theatres throughout England. His 1819 play, Wanted: a wife, was a comedy that gently ridiculed "lonely heart" ads. In 1830, he conceived the operatic drama Van Diemen's Land, concerning the notorious bush-ranger Michael Howe. But his most popular production was Tom and Jerry, or Life in London (1821), a dramatisation of Life in London by Pierce Egan, whose Boxiana Moncrieff had begun to publish in 1818. Tom and Jerry was an outstanding success, becoming the first play to achieve a run of 100 performances.

In 1818, he wrote The visitors' new guide to the spa of Leamington Priors and its vicinity. Then in 1824, he wrote Excursion to Warwick, and also, Excursion to Stratford upon Avon, ... with a compendious life of Shakspeare, ... account of the ... Jubilee, catalogue of the Shakspeare relics, etc.

He managed Vauxhall Gardens in 1827 and in 1833 leased the City Theatre. His play Samuel Weller, or, The Pickwickians was performed in London in 1837 starring W. J. Hammond as Sam Weller while Dickens was still writing The Pickwick Papers. In 1837, he also had a very public feud with Dickens, over Montcrieff's unauthorised staging of Dicken's play Nicholas Nickleby.

Soon afterward his sight failed, and in 1843 he became totally blind. The following year he entered the Charterhouse in London. Moncrieff's theatrical reminiscences were published in the Sunday Times in 1851.  He edited Selections from Dramatic Works (London, 1850), containing 24 of his own plays.

References

Sources
 The New Century Cyclopedia of Names, ed. Clarence L. Barnhart (Appleton-Century-Crofts, New York, 1954). p. 2788
 

 

Writers from London
1794 births
1857 deaths
English blind people
English male dramatists and playwrights
19th-century English dramatists and playwrights
19th-century English male writers